The Antarctic Micronational Union (AMU) is an intermicronational organization that aims to regulate micronational claims in Antarctica. The purpose of the AMU is to protect the claims of its members against other claimants.

History 
The Antarctic Micronational Union was founded on 6 December 2008 by the Grand Duchy of Flandrensis, Mary State, and the Kingdom of Finismund to solve the conflict between these micronations on the one side, and the Grand Duchy of Westarctica on the other. The conflict ended with Westarctica signing the West Antarctic Treaty and joining the AMU on 24 September 2010.

After undergoing a number of reforms and periods of inactivity, the AMU was revived to its present state on February 24, 2020. The Administrative-General of the AMU since September 2014 is Yaroslav Mar, the President of Lostisland, re-elected to another term in February 2020.

Members 
Members are the following:

 Missionary Order of the Celtic Cross
 Grand Duchy of Flandrensis
 Hortanian Empire
 Empire of Karnia-Ruthenia
 Federal Republic of Lostisland
 Empire of Pavlov
 Grand Duchy of Pikeland
 Republic of Užupis
 Grand Duchy of Westarctica

References

External links 

Micronational culture
International political organizations
Antarctic agencies